MNRK Music Group (pronounced "monarch", formerly known as Koch Records and eOne Music) is a New York City-based independent record label and music management company. It was formed in 2009 from the music assets of Koch Entertainment, which had been acquired by the present-day Entertainment One (eOne) in 2005. In April 2021, after the acquisition of eOne by Hasbro, the company announced that it would sell eOne Music to The Blackstone Group.

It owns the libraries of Artemis Records, Dualtone Records, and Last Gang Records.

History 
eOne as a whole has its origins in the music distributor Records on Wheels, which was acquired by the Canadian retail chain CD Plus in 2001 to expand its wholesale business. Darren Throop joined the company after CD Plus acquired his record store chain Urban Sound Exchange. The combined company later became known as ROW Entertainment, with Throop as president and CEO. In June 2005, ROW acquired the American independent music distributor and home entertainment publisher Koch Entertainment, including its label Koch Records. 

In 2008, MNRK Music Group distributed the record label HipHopCanada Digital from the longest-running and largest source of Canadian Hip Hop news. Koch was renamed E1 Music in 2009. It acquired IndieBlu Music, parent of Artemis Records and V2 Records North America, in 2010.

In 2013, eOne acquired the library of defunct hip-hop label Death Row Records. In January 2016, eOne acquired Dualtone Records. In March 2016, eOne acquired Canadian label Last Gang Records, and hired its founder, music industry lawyer Chris Taylor, as global president of eOne Music.

In 2016, eOne acquired the management firms Hardlivings and Nerve Artist Management.  In November 2016, eOne Music hired Ted May, the former senior international marketing manager of Universal Music UK, as director for its UK division, operating from eOne's offices in London. In March 2018, eOne Music acquired the live event production company Round Room Entertainment.

In 2019, Amelia Artists partnered with eOne's management division. Later in 2019, eOne partnered with the Latin management and marketing group Entotal. In November 2020, it signed AMPED Distribution as its new physical distributor in North America.

In April 2021, following the acquisition of its parent company by toy and entertainment company Hasbro, eOne announced that it would divest its music business to the private equity firm The Blackstone Group for $385 million, in order to focus more on its film and television entertainment businesses. The sale was completed in June, and the unit continued to use the eOne branding until September 2021; when the company was subsequently renamed MNRK Music Group.

On February 9, 2022, MNRK sold the rights to the Death Row Records brand and catalogue to rapper Snoop Dogg.

See also 
 Bonnie Gallanter, music manager
 List of MNRK Music Group artists (list includes artists signed to or distributed by Koch)
 MNRK Music Group discography

References

External links 
 

 
The Blackstone Group companies
American independent record labels
Smooth jazz record labels
Hip hop record labels
Jazz record labels
2021 mergers and acquisitions